Pycnophyidae is a family of kinorhynchs in the class Allomalorhagida.

Genera
The following genera are recognised:
Cristaphyes Sánchez, Yamasaki, Pardos, Sørensen & Martínez, 2016
Fujuriphyes Sánchez, Yamasaki, Pardos, Sørensen & Martínez, 2016
Higginsium Sánchez, Yamasaki, Pardos, Sørensen & Martínez, 2016
Kinorhynchus Sheremetevskij, 1974
Krakenella Sánchez, Yamasaki, Pardos, Sørensen & Martínez, 2016
Leiocanthus Sánchez, Yamasaki, Pardos, Sørensen & Martínez, 2016
Pycnophyes Zelinka, 1907
Setaphyes Sánchez, Yamasaki, Pardos, Sørensen & Martínez, 2016

References

External links
 
 

Kinorhyncha
Ecdysozoa families